Carl Øyvind Apeland (also known as Calle Apeland) (born April 18, 1964). Is a Norwegian musician plays bass, guitar, and keyboard in the Norwegian band Vamp.

He has composed some of the band's hits like "Sommar i hekken", also co-wrote "Ingeborg" (with Jan Toft another band member), "Sirkus av lys", "Byen" and "Svin på skog" (with Odin Aarvik Staveland).

References

1964 births
Living people
Norwegian male bass guitarists
Norwegian rock guitarists
Norwegian male guitarists
Norwegian rock keyboardists
Norwegian multi-instrumentalists